Kenneth Stewart Crosby (born December 15, 1947) is a Canadian former major league baseball pitcher for the Chicago Cubs.

He grew up in Provo, Utah and attended BYU, where he played on the baseball team from 1967 to 1969. He was a 10th round pick by the New York Yankees in 1969. He would go on to play in the majors in 1975 and 1976, both years with the Cubs. He played in 16 career games with a 1–0 record and an ERA of 8.41 in 20 innings.

External links

Major League Baseball pitchers
Major League Baseball players from Canada
Chicago Cubs players
Sportspeople from Provo, Utah
People from the Regional District of Central Kootenay
BYU Cougars baseball players
Canadian emigrants to the United States
Living people
1947 births
Baseball people from British Columbia
Johnson City Yankees players
Kinston Eagles players
Manchester Yankees players
Midland Cubs players
Syracuse Chiefs players
Tulsa Oilers (baseball) players
Wichita Aeros players
Provo High School alumni